Where Flamingos Fly is an album by jazz composer, arranger, conductor and pianist Gil Evans, originally recorded in 1971 for Capitol Records but not released until 1981, and performed by Evans with an orchestra featuring Billy Harper, Howard Johnson, Johnny Coles, and Don Preston.

Reception
The Allmusic review by Scott Yanow awarded the album 2½ stars stating "This transitional LP features arranger Gil Evans shortly after he decided to put together a permanent big band. Although the music didn't come out until a decade later, it is actually quite worthwhile".

Track listing
All compositions arranged and conducted by Gil Evans.
 "Zee Zee" (Gil Evans) - 10:58  
 "Naña" (Mario Telles, Moacir Santos, Yanna Coti) - 4:42  
 "Love Your Love" (Billy Harper) - 2:13  
 "Jelly Rolls" [mistitled "Hotel Me" on the original release] (Gil Evans) - 5:32  
 "Where Flamingos Fly" (Elthea Peale, Harold Courlander, John Benson Brooks) - 5:12  
 "El Matador" (Kenny Dorham) - 17:30  
Recorded in New York City in 1971.

Personnel
Gil Evans - piano, electric piano, tack piano, arranger, conductor 
Billy Harper - tenor saxophone, chimes
Trevor Koehler - soprano saxophone, baritone saxophone (tracks 2-5) 
Johnny Coles, Hannibal Peterson, Stan Shafran (tracks 2-5) - trumpet
Jimmy Knepper - trombone (tracks 2-5)  
Howard Johnson - tuba, baritone saxophone, flugelhorn
Harry Lookofsky - tenor violin (tracks 1 & 6)  
Joe Beck - guitar, mandolin (tracks 1 & 6)
Don Preston, Phil Davis (tracks 2-5) - synthesizer  
Bruce Johnson - guitar (tracks 2-5)  
Richard Davis - double bass (tracks 2-5)    
Herb Bushler (tracks 1 & 6), Bill Quinze (tracks 2-5) - electric bass   
Lenny White (tracks 1 & 6), Bruce Ditmas (tracks 2-5) - drums  
Sue Evans - percussion, marimba (tracks 1, 2 & 6)  
Airto Moreira, Flora Purim - vocals, percussion (tracks 2 & 6)

References 

1981 albums
Gil Evans albums
Albums produced by John Simon (record producer)
Artists House albums